Tom McKenna may refer to:

Tom McKenna (footballer, born 1891) (1891–1974), Irish footballer
Tom McKenna (footballer, born 1919) (1919–2008), Scottish footballer
Tom McKenna (town planner) (1925–1977), Australian planner, instrumental to the development of Adelaide and Canberra
Tom McKenna, a character in the comic A History of Violence

See also
 Thomas McKenna (disambiguation)